Christina Marie Kendziorski is a biostatistician whose research involves genomics, statistical genetics, and the statistical analysis of data from high-throughput sequencing. She is a professor in the Department of Biostatistics & Medical Informatics at the University of Wisconsin–Madison,

Education and career
Kendziorski grew up in the housing projects of Chicago, in an apartment shared by her mother and grandmother, neither of whom had a college education.
She earned a bachelor's degree in mathematics in 1992 from the University of Wisconsin–Eau Claire, and completed her Ph.D. in 1998 from Marquette University, where she studied mathematics with a specialization in biostatistics. Her dissertation, supervised by Peter J. Tonellato, was A Physiologially Based Mathematical Model of Arterial Pressure Recordings.

After completing her doctorate, Kendziorski became a postdoctoral scholar at the University of Wisconsin–Madison. She was hired as regular-rank faculty there in 2001. Since 2010, she has headed the Statistical Genetics and Genomics program in Wisconsin's Institute for Translational and Clinical Research.

Recognition
Kendziorski became a Fellow of the American Statistical Association in 2018.

References

External links
Home page

Year of birth missing (living people)
Living people
American statisticians
Women statisticians
Biostatisticians
University of Wisconsin–Eau Claire alumni
University of Wisconsin–Madison faculty
Fellows of the American Statistical Association